Peyton Hendershot (born April 23, 1999) is an American football tight end for the Dallas Cowboys of the National Football League (NFL). He played college football at Indiana.

College career
Hendershot played college football at the Indiana University Bloomington. He appeared in 32 games across four seasons with the Hoosiers, playing for head coach Tom Allen. As a senior in 2021, Hendershot had 543 receiving yards and four touchdowns and earned Third-team All-Big Ten honors.

Statistics

Professional career

Hendershot signed with the Dallas Cowboys as an undrafted free agent in 2022. He made the initial 53-man roster out of training camp. In Week 7 of the 2022 season, he scored his first NFL touchdown on a two-yard reception in the 24–6 victory over the Detroit Lions. As a rookie, he appeared in all 17 games and started two. He recorded 11 receptions for 103 receiving yards and two receiving touchdowns. In addition, he had a role on special teams.

NFL career statistics

References

External links

Dallas Cowboys bio
Indiana Hoosiers bio

1999 births
Living people
Players of American football from Indiana
American football tight ends
Indiana Hoosiers football players
Dallas Cowboys players